The Emails I Can't Send Tour is the fourth headlining concert tour by American singer, songwriter and actress Sabrina Carpenter in support of her fifth studio album Emails I Can't Send (2022). The tour began on September 29, 2022 in Atlanta, United States and is set to conclude on June 27, 2023 in Berlin, Germany, comprising 65 shows throughout two legs in North America, one leg in South America and one leg in Europe.

Background 
On July 31, 2022, Carpenter posted a childhood picture of herself on her Instagram account, with the caption, "What songs would you guys wanna hear on tour [...] asking for a friend"  hinting at a tour.

On August 15, 2022, Carpenter announced the Emails I Can't Send Tour in support of her fifth studio album, Emails I Can't Send (2022), revealing the date schedule, locations, and venues for 12 shows. It marked her first concert tour in three years since her previous Singular Tour (2019). Carpenter announced on September 24, 2022 that Girlhouse would serve as the opening act.

Due to demand in the original shows' pre-sale, a second date in New York City was added for October 5, 2022. A date in Toronto, Canada was also added for October 10, 2022. On September 27, 2022, Carpenter announced that the opening show would be postponed due to safety concerns caused by Hurricane Ian marking the tour's official start date as September 29, 2022. In a digital cover story for American Songwriter in late October, Carpenter confirmed that an extension of the tour would follow with dates scheduled for 2023. 

On December 12, 2022, she announced a second North American leg of the tour, scheduled from March to late May 2023, comprising 39 dates (3 added by demand so far), and also revealed that international dates will be incorporated in the future. Carpenter further said that "some new songs" would be performed. On January 30, 2023, the third leg of the tour was announced, consisting of 10 shows taking place in Europe and the United Kingdom.

Ticketing 
Pre-sale for the initial first leg commenced on August 16, 2022. Tickets and VIP packages went on sale to the general public on August 19, 2022, via Ticketmaster. American Express cardholders had exclusive access two days earlier, from August 17 through the evening of August 18. The following day, Carpenter revealed the tour had sold out in less than a day.

Setlist 
This setlist is from the show in Atlanta on September 29, 2022. It does not represent all concerts for the duration of the tour.
{{Div col|content=#"Emails I Can't Send"
"Bet U Wanna"
"Vicious"
"Read Your Mind"
"Already Over" / "Bad for Business" / "Skinny Dipping"
"Tornado Warnings"
"How Many Things"
"Can't Blame a Girl for Trying"
"Bust Your Windows"
"Nonsense"
"Paris"
"Honeymoon Fades"
"Sue Me"
"Fast Times"
Encore
"Decode"
"Because I Liked a Boy"}}

Notes
During the show in Boston, "You're So Vain" was performed instead of "Bust Your Windows".

Shows

References

Notes

2022 concert tours
2023 concert tours